Karan-Yelga (Qaranyılğa) is a rural locality (a selo) in Novotroitsky Selsoviet, Chishminsky District, Bashkortostan, Russia. The population was 130 as of 2010. There are 2 streets.

Geography 
Karan-Yelga is located 32 km southeast of Chishmy (the district's administrative centre) by road. Sayranovo is the nearest rural locality.

References 

Rural localities in Chishminsky District